The Make-Up Artists and Hair Stylists Guild Award for Best Contemporary Make-Up for a Feature Film is one of the awards given annually to people working in the motion picture industry by the Make-Up Artists and Hair Stylists Guild (MUAHS). It is presented to the makeup artists whose work has been deemed "best" in a given year, within a contemporary-set film. The award was first given in 2000, during the first annual awards, and was given when the awards were brought back in 2014.

Winners and nominees

1990s

2000s

2010s

2020s

References

Contemporary Make-Up in a Feature-Length Motion Picture